Bergland is a census-designated place (CDP) and the primary community in Bergland Township, Ontonagon County, Michigan, United States. It is situated on the north shore of Lake Gogebic, the largest natural inland lake on the Upper Peninsula of Michigan. Highway M-28 passes through the center of town, leading east  to Bruce Crossing and southwest  to Wakefield. Bergland is bordered to the west by the Lake Gogebic CDP. 

The community was first listed as a CDP prior to the 2020 census.

Demographics

References 

Census-designated places in Ontonagon County, Michigan
Census-designated places in Michigan
Unincorporated communities in Ontonagon County, Michigan
Unincorporated communities in Michigan